The 2018 Regional Women's Twenty20 Championship was the fourth season of the women's Twenty20 cricket competition played in the West Indies. It took place in June 2018, with 6 teams taking part and mainly taking place in Kingston. Barbados won the tournament, claiming their first T20 title.

The tournament was followed by the 2018 Women's Regional Super50.

Competition format 
Teams played in a round-robin in a group of six, therefore playing 5 matches overall. Matches were played using a Twenty20 format. The top team in the group were crowned the Champions.

The group worked on a points system with positions being based on the total points. Points were awarded as follows:

Win: 3 points 
Loss: 0 points.
Abandoned/No Result: 2 points.

Points table

Source: Windies Cricket

Statistics

Most runs

Source: CricketArchive

Most wickets

Source: CricketArchive

References

External links
 Series home at Windies Cricket

Twenty20 Blaze
2018 in West Indian cricket